Indobune is an extinct genus of ungulate endemic to Asia during the Eocene from 55.8—48.6 Ma, living for approximately .

Taxonomy
Indobune was named by Rose et al. (2006). Its type is Indobune vastanensis. It was assigned to Anthracobunidae by Rose et al. (2006). However, in a 2014 cladistic analysis it was suggested to more likely be a member of Cambaytheriidae.

Fossil distribution
Indobune fossil distribution is restricted to Gujarat state, India (Vastan lignite mine).

References

Eocene odd-toed ungulates
Eocene mammals of Asia